The Tornado outbreak sequence of March 9–13, 2006 was an early season and long lasting tornado outbreak sequence in the central United States that started on the morning of March 9 and continued for over four days until the evening of March 13. The outbreak produced 99 confirmed tornadoes. The tornadoes killed a total of 10 people. The total damage by the severe weather was in excess of $1 billion.

Meteorological synopsis
The period of active weather started with a major derecho event on March 9 across the South Central United States, that also included several tornadoes, although straight-line winds did most of the damage. Numerous injuries and at least two fatalities were reported, but mostly due to the thunderstorm winds. The two fatalities were as a result of a weather-related automobile accident and a fire started by lightning. Tens of thousands of people also lost electricity throughout the region.

Activity calmed down on March 10 with little severe weather reported, but picked up again the next day.

On the evening of March 11, 18 tornadoes developed across the region. One of them flattened a mobile home park and left many people injured and at least 2 dead in Perry County, Missouri. Several other tornadoes left heavy damage in Missouri, Illinois and Arkansas. The tornadoes were accompanied by very large hail, some as large as softballs.

More severe weather developed in the morning of March 12. The Kansas City Metropolitan Area was hardest hit, with significant wind and hail damage to many homes and businesses, but only two tornadoes in the far northwestern part of the area. Significant damage was also reported at the University of Kansas in Lawrence and at the Great Wolf Lodge Indoor Water Park. Numerous airplanes also flipped over at the Kansas City Downtown Airport.

March 12 would be the most prolific day of the outbreak, and one of the most active days in recent history, with at least 62 confirmed tornado touchdowns. In addition, microburst winds exceeding  and hail as large as softballs have been reported. Several major tornadoes were reported in Missouri (along Interstate 70 near Columbia MO; there was also an F4 tornado to the north/northeast of Columbia and just to the north of the St. Louis Viewing Area). Significant destruction from separate tornadoes was dealt to Pike County Missouri (north of St. Louis) as well as central Illinois.

One exceptionally long-lived supercell thunderstorm was responsible for many of the tornadoes on March 12. This storm began in the morning over northern Oklahoma before embarking on a nearly  journey northeast across southeastern Kansas, Missouri during the afternoon and early evening, into Illinois during the mid-to-late evening, through Indiana by the late evening, and into lower Michigan where it lost severe characteristics more than 17.5 hours after inception. This supercell lasted the longest and travelled the furthest than any other in history. The city of Springfield, Illinois saw two strong tornadoes track directly through the city from this storm. It also did damage near Sedalia, Columbia, and Mexico, Missouri. The strongest tornado, spawned by a different supercell, was a rare double tornado rated F4, but fortunately it remained over mainly rural countryside.

Fifteen more tornadoes – all of them weak – were reported on March 13 in Alabama and Mississippi before the system finally weakened and the severe weather came to an end.

Confirmed tornadoes

March 9 event

March 10 event

There were no reported tornadoes on Friday, March 10, 2006.

March 11 event
Note that many of these tornadoes occurred in the late evening of March 11 in Central Standard Time; the UTC time after 0600 is on March 12.

March 12 event
Note that some of these tornadoes occurred overnight into March 13, however they were part of the same continuous outbreak.

March 13 event

Non–tornadic events

Quad Cities Area
Extremely strong winds were recorded throughout northwestern Illinois and eastern Iowa. The wind measurement was verified with backup equipment from the FAA after the main instrument failed.

The winds, which were equivalent to a strong Category 2 hurricane, caused severe damage to numerous houses, along with countless trees and power lines. The damage was reported to have been caused by a microburst.

Northern Illinois
The microburst hit the area just after midnight on March 13, and may have been part of a supercell to hit the southern suburbs just before the thunderstorm complex exited the area at 3:00 a.m. CST. Roofs were ripped off apartments along a three block length, and seven garages were damaged or destroyed, according to the ''Chicago Tribune'. Harlem Avenue in Bridgeview (Illinois Route 43) in the vicinity of 77th Street was closed for four hours while debris was cleared from the road.

Flash flooding closed U.S. Route 45 around U.S. Route 30, but major flooding was not reported on any of the area highways during the rush hour. 15,000 customers were left without power as the thunderstorms passed. The number had been reduced to 2,000 by daybreak, but strong winds knocked a total of 17,000 customers offline as of midday Monday.

Strong winds also forced the closure of parts of downtown Evanston when building material blew off a 29-story building, slightly injuring a construction worker. Four more construction workers were injured, one seriously, in Antioch when a roof being constructed for a new church collapsed due to the wind.

Eastern Illinois
Both Ford County, Illinois and Iroquois County, Illinois recorded damage due to microbursts. In Iroquois County, most of a cattle building was blown into a field just west of Illinois Route 1 near Milford.

Damage around Crescent City and Interstate 57 in Iroquois County was likely caused by straight-line winds.

See also
List of North American tornadoes and tornado outbreaks
Tornadoes of 2006

References

External links
Storm Prediction Center

F4 tornadoes by date
 ,2006-03-09
Tornadoes of 2006
Tornadoes in Illinois
Tornadoes in Missouri
Derechos in the United States
2006 natural disasters in the United States
March 2006 events in the United States